Steven E. McElroy (born December 30, 1966) is an American director, actor, teacher and writer.

Education and career highlights
McElroy, a Providence, Rhode Island native, graduated with a B.A. in Theatre Arts and English Literature from Brown University in 1988 and received his M.F.A. from the Alabama Shakespeare Festival

In the late 1990s, McElroy was artistic director of Sensurround, Inc., where he directed Lynn Siefert's Coyote Ugly and Little Egypt as well as his own adaptation of Jean-Paul Sartre's The Flies. From 1998 to 2002, he was artistic director of The New Ensemble Theatre Co., Inc. (TNE) in New York City. He has been a member of Emerging Artists Theatre Co. (EAT) since 2001, and is also a member of LITE (Laboratory for International Theatre Exchange).

McElroy also writes for the daily Culture pages and weekly Arts and Leisure sections of The New York Times, and The New York Times on the Web.

Directing credits

Emerging Artists Theatre Co. (EAT)
 Woman With Coffee
 The Child
 Vanda, Screaming in the Wilderness (The Mint Theatre)
 Michael Murphy, The Uninvited Guest (The Mint Theatre)
 Bash Halow, SPREAD 'EM (INTAR)
Bash Halow, Forward Motion Matters
 Bash Halow, Roller Coasting With Fabio
 Peter Macklin, Someplace Warm (winner, 2001 Samuel French New Play Competition)
 Bash Halow, Forward Motion Matters

Laboratory for International Theatre Exchange (LITE)/Chekov Now!
2004
 Anton Chekhov, Three Sisters

The New Ensemble Theatre Co., Inc. (TNE)
 1998
 William Shakespeare, Romeo and Juliet (Access Theatre)
 1999
 Mike Nuckols, And The Skies Were Opened
 2000
 Ron Owens, Pig
 Paul Angelo Viggiano, Hostage
 2001
 (adapted by Steven McElroy) V: The Life of Henry Plantagenet
 2002
 Tom Noonan, What Happened Was…
 Bash Halow, Inertia (includes Forward Motion Matters and Roller Coasting With Fabio)

The Producers' Club
 Maria Seigenthaler, The Sweet By & By (reading)
 George Gustines, Papered Over

Sensurround, Inc.
 Lynn Siefert, Coyote Ugly (Alice's Fourth Floor)
 Lynn Siefert, Little Egypt (Irish Arts Center)
1999
 Jean-Paul Sartre (adapted by Steven McElroy), The Flies

size ate productions and Emerging Artists Theatre Co.
2005
 Margaux Laskey, size.ate (winner, 2005 New York Innovative Theatre Award)

Spotlight ON Productions
2002
 Kevin Brofsky, Awaken the Wolves (winner, SpotlightON best production, 2002)

Wings Theatre Company
 Mark Finley, Better Now (part of Beyond Christopher Street: A Night of Gay Shorts)

Others
1995
 Ron Owens, Todd of the Apes
more TK

Acting credits

Stage
1980's
 Hector - John Byrne, The Slab Boys (Brown University)
 Hotbed (Miranda Theatre)
1998
 The King Stag (Access Theatre)
1999
 Michael John Garcez, suits (Theatre Three)
 Hamlet - William Shakespeare, Hamlet (TNE)
2000
 Camp Holocaust (La Tea Theatre)

Film
 Bamboozled (2000), directed by Spike Lee
More TK

Writing credits

Journalism
Selected
 "Now Arguing Near You: The Evolution Drama." The New York Times, 12 October 2005.
 "A Domestic Play Takes a Stormy Path." The New York Times, 4 December 2005.
 "Now, for the Accounting Of the Opera." The New York Times, 8 January 2006.
 "Nine to Watch, Onstage and Off." The New York Times, 26 February 2006.
 "The Comedy Is Restoration, but the Sex Is Timeless." The New York Times, 7 March 2006.
 "Da Vinci Code Banned in Iran." The New York Times on the Web, 26 July 2006.
 "Night at the Opera For the Price Of a Drink." The New York Times, 6 August 2006.
 "Red-Nosed Life Lessons: Clowns With a Fear Factor." The New York Times, 3 September 2006.
 "Off Off Broadway When It Was Just Downtown." The New York Times, 22 September 2006.
 "Giving MaMa What She Wants: Vintage Sam Shepard." The New York Times, 4 October 2006.
 "An Actor Uses His Second Language: Speech." The New York Times, 15 October 2006.
 "Adapting a Book (and Himself) for the Stage." The New York Times, 3 December 2006.
 "Efforts to Save a London Museum." The New York Times on the Web, 2 January 2007.
 "How a Cast Got Its Kicks. And Throws. And Punches." The New York Times, 24 February 2007.
 "MyTheater, Seeking Friends." The New York Times, 4 March 2007.
 "Having Words About That Word." The New York Times, 18 March 2007.
 "Illusory Characters With Startling Stage Presence." The New York Times, 2 April 2007.
 "Clowns, Remember Your Balloon Deduction." The New York Times, 15 April 2007.
 "Three Writers Of Nonfiction Are Honored." The New York Times, 10 May 2007.
 "Faster Than a Flying Pumpkin." The New York Times, 13 May 2007.
 "The Geisha-and-Houseboy-Liberation Theater." The New York Times, 20 May 2007.
 "Where Off Off Took Off." The New York Times, 8 June 2007.

Plays
Adaptations
 Jean-Paul Sartre, The Flies (1999)
 William Shakespeare, V: The Life of Henry Plantagenet (2001)

External links
 Steven McElroy - EAT profile page
 Steven McElroy - TNE biography page

References

1966 births
Living people
Actors from Providence, Rhode Island
Brown University alumni
University of Alabama alumni
American theatre directors
American male stage actors
20th-century American dramatists and playwrights
American male film actors
The New York Times writers
Place of birth missing (living people)
Writers from Providence, Rhode Island